Louis Heusghem (26 December 1882 – 26 August 1939) was a Belgian professional road bicycle racer. He was the brother of cyclists Hector Heusghem and Pierre-Joseph Heusghem. His best Tour de France finish was his fifth place in 1911. In 1912, he won a stage in the Tour de France and Paris–Tours.

Major results

1911
Tour de France:
5th place overall classification
1912
Paris–Tours
Tour de France:
Winner stage 12

External links 

Official Tour de France results for Louis Heusghem

Belgian male cyclists
1882 births
1939 deaths
Belgian Tour de France stage winners
Sportspeople from Charleroi
Cyclists from Hainaut (province)